Fandorin is a fictitious Russian surname in the novels of Boris Akunin. Series protagonists include:

 Erast Fandorin (1856–1919/20)
 Nicholas Fandorin (born 1960)

See also
 von Dorn

Russian-language surnames